6100 or variation, may refer to:

In general
 A.D. 6100, a year in the 7th millennium CE
 6100 BC, a year in the 7th millennium BCE
 6100, a number in the 6000 (number) range

Electronics and computing
 Intersil 6100, a microprocessor CPU chip
 Nokia 6100, a cellphone
 Power Macintosh 6100 personal computer

Other uses
 6100 Kunitomoikkansai, an asteroid in the Asteroid Belt, the 6100th asteroid registered; see List_of_minor_planets:_6001–7000
 GWR 6100 Class, a side tank locomotive train class
 NS 6100, a Dutch tank engine locomotive train class

See also